The 1971 Census of India was the 11th in a series of censuses held in India every decade since 1872.

The population of India was counted as 547,949,809 people.

Population by state

Information
The schedule contained 35 questions.

See also
Demographics of India

Notes

References

External links

Census Of India, 1971
Censuses in India
Political history of India
India